Mauricio Sanna (born 26 October 1996) is an Argentine professional footballer who plays as a midfielder for Torres.

Career
Sanna spent time with Quilmes, prior to joining Atlético Tucumán in 2014. His professional debut came on 28 May 2017 versus Talleres. In January 2019, Sanna completed a move to Italian football after agreeing a contract with Serie D side Acireale; he had been training with the club for four previous months. Ahead of the 2019–20 season, Sanna joined another Serie D club in ASD Lanusei. One goal in fourteen matches followed, in a campaign that was curtailed due to the COVID-19 pandemic. In August 2020, Sanna moved across the fourth tier to Torres; a team he scored against with Lanusei.

Personal life
Sanna is of Italian descent; his grandad was born in Thiesi.

Career statistics
.

References

External links

1996 births
Living people
Sportspeople from San Miguel de Tucumán
Argentine footballers
Association football midfielders
Argentine expatriate footballers
Expatriate footballers in Italy
Argentine expatriate sportspeople in Italy
Argentine Primera División players
Serie D players
Atlético Tucumán footballers
S.S.D. Acireale Calcio 1946 players
S.E.F. Torres 1903 players